Sebastian "Wastl" Huber (26 June 1901 in Füssen – 6 March 1985 in Füssen) was a German bobsledder who competed from the late 1920s to the mid-1930s. Competing in three Winter Olympics, he won two bronze medals at the Winter Olympics, earning Germany its first Winter Olympic medal in (1928) and in the four-man event (1932).

Huber earned three gold medals at the FIBT World Championships with one in the two-man event (1931) and two in the four-man event (1934, 1935).

References

 Bobsleigh four-man Olympic medalists for 1924, 1932-56, and since 1964
 Bobsleigh five-man Olympic medalists for 1928
 Bobsleigh two-man world championship medalists since 1931
 Bobsleigh four-man world championship medalists since 1930
 
 Wallenchinsky, David. (1984). "Bobsled". In The Complete Book the Olympics: 1896-1980. New York: Penguin Books. pp. 558–60.

External links
 
 

1901 births
1985 deaths
German male bobsledders
Bobsledders at the 1928 Winter Olympics
Bobsledders at the 1932 Winter Olympics
Bobsledders at the 1936 Winter Olympics
Olympic bobsledders of Germany
Olympic bronze medalists for Germany
Olympic medalists in bobsleigh
Medalists at the 1928 Winter Olympics
Medalists at the 1932 Winter Olympics
Sportspeople from Füssen